Megamelus is a genus of delphacid planthoppers in the family Delphacidae. There are at least 30 described species in Megamelus.

Species
These 37 species belong to the genus Megamelus:

 Megamelus aestus Metcalf, 1923 i c g
 Megamelus bellicus Remes Lenicov and Sosa in Sosa, Remes Lenicov and Mariani, 2007 i c g
 Megamelus bifidus Beamer, 1955 i c g
 Megamelus bifurcatus Crawford, 1914 i c g
 Megamelus coronus Beamer, 1955 i c g
 Megamelus davisi Van Duzee, 1897 i c g b
 Megamelus discrepans Haupt, 1930 i c g
 Megamelus distinctus Metcalf, 1923 i c g b
 Megamelus electrae Muir, 1926 i c g
 Megamelus falcatus Beamer, 1955 i c g
 Megamelus flavus Crawford, 1914 i c g
 Megamelus gracilis Beamer, 1955 i c g b
 Megamelus hamatus Beamer, 1955 i c g
 Megamelus inflatus Metcalf, 1923 i c g
 Megamelus iphigeniae Muir, 1926 i c g
 Megamelus kahus (Kirkaldy, 1907) c g
 Megamelus leimonias (Kirkaldy, 1907) i c g
 Megamelus leptus Fieber, 1878 i c g
 Megamelus lobatus Beamer, 1955 i c g
 Megamelus longicornis (Dozier, 1922) i c g
 Megamelus lunatus Beamer, 1955 i c g b
 Megamelus metzaria Crawford, 1914 i c g b
 Megamelus notula (Germar, 1830) i
 Megamelus notulus (Germar, 1830) c g
 Megamelus palaetus (Van Duzee, 1897) i c g b
 Megamelus paludicola Lindberg, 1937 c g
 Megamelus piceus Van Duzee, 1894 g
 Megamelus quadrimaculatus (Signoret, 1865) c g
 Megamelus recurvatus Beamer, 1955 i c g
 Megamelus scutellaris Berg, 1883 i c g
 Megamelus spartini Osborn, 1905 c g
 Megamelus sponsa Kirkaldy, 1907 i c g
 Megamelus timehri Muir, 1919 i c g
 Megamelus toddi Beamer, 1955 i c g
 Megamelus trifidus Beamer, 1955 i c g
 Megamelus ungulatus Beamer, 1955 i c g
 Megamelus venosus (Germar, 1830) c g

Data sources: i = ITIS, c = Catalogue of Life, g = GBIF, b = Bugguide.net

References

Further reading

External links

 

Delphacini
Articles created by Qbugbot
Auchenorrhyncha genera